A referendum on the sugar industry was held in Switzerland on 14 March 1948. Voters were asked whether they approved of a federal resolution on the reorganisation of the Swiss sugar industry. The proposal was rejected by 63.8% of voters.

Background
The referendum was an optional referendum, which only a majority of the vote, as opposed to the mandatory referendums, which required a double majority; a majority of the popular vote and majority of the cantons.

Results

References

1948 referendums
1948 in Switzerland
Referendums in Switzerland